Panangattiri is a village in Kollengode, Palakkad district of Kerala state, India.

Venkitachalapathy temple is a popular attraction here. Every year in April, the temple celebrates Prathista Dhinam organised by  Gramma Brahmana Samooham .

References 

Villages in Palakkad district